Casas is a Spanish surname. Notable people with the surname include:

Acting
Antonio Casas (1911–1982), Spanish actor
Mario Casas (born 1986), Spanish actor
Óscar Casas (born 1998), Spanish actor

Art
David Zamora Casas, Mexican-American visual artist, performance artist, and community activist 
Juan Francisco Casas (born 1976), Spanish artist and poet
Mel Casas (1929–2014), American-born artist, activist, writer and teacher
Ramon Casas i Carbó (1866–1932), Spanish artist

Law
Fernando Vizcaíno Casas (1926–2003), Spanish labour lawyer, journalist, and writer
María Emilia Casas (born 1950), Spanish jurist
Mariana Casas (born 1959), Argentine lawyer

Politics
David Casas (born 1971), American politician in Georgia
Roberto Casas (born 1931), Cuban-born American politician in Florida
Sergio Casas (born 1971), Argentine politician

Sports

Cycling
Ana Teresa Casas (born 1991), Mexican racing cyclist
Claudio José Casas (born 1982), Spanish road racing cyclist
Félix García Casas (born 1968), Spanish road cyclist
Helena Casas (born 1988), Spanish track cyclist from Catalonia
Iván Casas (born 1980), Colombian racing cyclist
José Casas (cyclist) (born 1945), Spanish racing cyclist
Julia Casas (born 1980), Spanish racing cyclist
Miguel Casas (1920–2003), Spanish cyclist

Football (soccer)
Aitor Casas (born 1992), Spanish footballer
Atzimba Casas (born 1994), American-born Mexican footballer
Bryan Casas (born 2004), Mexican footballer
Diego Casas (born 1995), Uruguayan footballer
Gastón Casas (born 1978), Argentine footballer and manager
Ismael Casas (born 2001), Spanish footballer
Javier Casas (footballer, born 1982), Spanish footballer
Javier Casas (soccer, born 2003), American soccer player
Louie Casas (born 1986), Filipino footballer
Marcelo Casas (born 1992), Paraguayan-Spanish footballer
Tomás Casas (born 1996), Argentine footballer
Yancarlo Casas (born 1981), Peruvian footballer

Wrestling
Casas wrestling family, a Mexican family of luchadors, or professional wrestlers
Canelo Casas (born 1982), Mexican wrestler
Danny Casas (born 1986), Mexican wrestler
Negro Casas (born 1960), Mexican wrestler

Other
Ana María Casas (born 1995), Mexican gymnast
André Casas (1934–2021), French rugby player
Iker Casas (born 1999), Mexican taekwondo practitioner
Ivo Casas (born 1992), Portuguese volleyball player
Jordi Casas (born 1976), Spanish field hockey player
Mireia Casas (born 1969), Spanish windsurfer
Queralt Casas (born 1992), Spanish basketball player
Ricard Casas (born 1962), Spanish basketball coach
Shaine Casas (born 1999), American swimmer
Triston Casas (born 2000), American baseball player
Víctoria Casas, Mexican swimmer

Other
Antoni Vila Casas (born 1930), Spanish pharmaceutical executive
Arthur Casas, Brazilian architect
Borita Casas (1911–1999), Spanish journalist, playwright and author
Carlos Casas (born 1974), Spanish filmmaker
Creu Casas (1913–2007), Spanish botanist from Catalonia
Estela Casas (born 1961), American health advocate and news anchor
Germán Casas (born 1939), Chilean singer
Myrna Casas (born 1934), Puerto Rican playwright and director
Penelope Casas (1943–2013), American food writer
Rosalba Casas (born 1950), Mexican-born professor of history and socio-politics in Canada

See also
 Louis-François Cassas (1756–1827), French artist, architect, and archeologist
 Casas (disambiguation)

Spanish-language surnames